= Cinq Isles Formation =

- Stratigraphic range: Early Devonian – Late Devonian
- Type: Formation

Lithology
- Primary: Non-marine siliciclastics

Location
- Region: Newfoundland
- Country: Canada
- Occurrence of the Cinq Isles Formation in southeastern Newfoundland

The Cinq Isles Formation is a formation cropping out in Newfoundland.
